Charles Wainwright may refer to:

 Charles S. Wainwright (1826–1907), Union Army artillery officer
 Charles Wainwright (British Army officer) (1893–1968), British Army officer